, known professionally by his ring name , is a Japanese professional boxer. He is a two-time and unified light flyweight champion, having held the WBC light flyweight title from 2017 to 2021, and the unified WBA (Super), WBC, and The Ring light flyweight titles since 2022. As of November 2022, he is ranked as the world's best active light flyweight by The Ring, the Transnational Boxing Rankings Board, ESPN, and BoxRec.

Personal life
Shiro is the son of Hisashi Teraji, a boxer who won the OPBF light heavyweight and Japanese national middleweight title. Hisashi's sole professional loss came against future world champion Shinji Takehara. He retired in 2000, at the age of 36. Shiro followed in his father's footsteps and accrued a 58–16 amateur record between 2007 and 2014.

On November 15, 2020, Shiro was involved in a drunk driving incident, during which he drove into another persons property and crashed into a vehicle parked there. He would later issue a public apology to the victim and his fans. As a result of this incident, the Japanese Boxing Commission suspended him for three months, issued a ¥3 million fine, and ordered him to perform between 48 and 200 hours community service.

Professional career

Early career
Shiro made his professional debut in August 2014, winning a six-round unanimous decision (60-53, 60–53, 59–54) against Heri Amol. Amol went down in round 4, after a right hand to the body. Shiro won his first belt in October 2015, beating Rolly Sumalpong for the WBC Youth light flyweight title by unanimous decision (97-91, 96–92, 96–92). During round 1, Shiro was dropped for the first time in his career but he adjusted and did enough to get the win. On his next fight, Shiro went on to claim the Japanese national light flyweight title, beating Kenichi Horikawa with a unanimous decision (98-93, 98–93, 97–93). In August 2016, Shiro claimed the OPBF title with another unanimous decision win (119-108, 119–109, 117–111) over Toshimasa Ouchi. The bout was Shiro's first 12-round fight.

WBC light flyweight champion

Shiro vs. López I
In May 2017, Shiro was scheduled to face the reigning WBC light flyweight world champion Ganigan López, in what was his 10th professional bout and López's second title defense.

Shiro won the closely contested bout by unanimous decision, with two of the judges scoring the fight 115–113 in his favor, and the third judge scoring the fight a 114–114 draw. Shiro was leading the fight on the scorecards going into the eight round, after which López managed to make a comeback. Shiro later stated he was unsure of how the judges had scored the fight, which was the reason why he engaged in trading power shots in the final round, attempting to knock López out. During the post-fight press conference, Shiro claimed he was dissatisfied with how he fought, saying he was too nervous in his first world title challenge to fight how he usually does.

Shiro's first fight with López was broadcast on Fuji TV and had an audience rating of 9.5% in the Kantō region, with about 1.76 million live viewers in Tokyo area alone.

Shiro vs. Guevara
Shiro was scheduled to make his first title defense against the former WBC light flyweight champion Pedro Guevara on October 22, 2017. Guevara had previously fought twice in Japan, having unseated Akira Yaegashi to claim the WBC title, at the Tokyo Metropolitan Gymnasium, and then losing his title to Yu Kimura in Sendai in a controversial split decision. The fight was a mandatory title bout, scheduled for the undercard of Ryota Murata’s rematch against WBA regular titlist Hassan N'Dam N'Jikam. Guevara started strongly but as the fight went on he started to slow down due to body shots, with the fight being scored as a draw after the first eight-round (78-74 Guevara, 77-75 Shiro and 76-76). Shiro rallied in the second half of the fight and won another narrow majority decision. Two of the judges scored the fight 115-113 and 116-112 for Shiro, while the third judge scored the fight a 114–114 draw. During the post-fight press conference, Shiro called for a rematch with Ganigan Lopez.

Shiro vs. Pedroza
Shiro was scheduled to defend his WBC light flyweight title for the third time against the #11 ranked WBC light flyweight Gilberto Pedroza, on December 30, 2017. During a pre-fight interview, Shiro stated he wanted to keep having at least three fights a year, in order to maintain his match fitness, as the reason for taking this fight. Shiro completely dominated the Panamanian fighter en route to a fourth-round technical knockout victory. Shiro knocked Pedroza down twice in the fourth round, with referee Laurence Cole deeming Pedroza unable to fight, following the second knockdown.

Shiro vs. López II
López was scheduled to make the third defense of his WBC light flyweight title in a rematch with the former champion Ganigan López, on May 25, 2018. Shiro won their first meeting by majority decision to become the WBC light flyweight champion. The fight was scheduled as the co-main event to the Naoya Inoue and Jamie McDonnell match. Shiro won the fight by a second-round body shot knockout. Mid-way through the second round, Shiro landed a right straight to the body of López, with López being unable to beat the ten-count. Shiro attributed his poor performance in their first meeting to the fact that he hadn't fought a southpaw up to that point, while he was more accustomed to fighting southpaw opponents in their second meeting.

Shiro vs. Melindo
Shiro was scheduled to mount the fourth defense of his WBC light flyweight title against the former IBF and IBO light flyweight champion Milan Melindo, on October 7, 2018. He once again fought on the undercard of Naoya Inoue, as Inoue took on Juan Carlos Payano. Shiro came into the fight as a 4/9 favorite. Shiro kept up a steady diet of jabs throughout the fight, which opened up a cut over Melindo's right eye. Near the end of the seventh round, referee Laurence Cole called in the ringside to doctor to assess the cut. The doctor decided to stop the fight, as Melindo's vision was compromised, which left him unable to continue fighting.

Shiro vs. Juárez
Shiro was scheduled to defend his WBC light flyweight title for the fifth time against the one-time WBC light flyweight title challenger Saúl Juárez. Shiro was a 1/12 betting favorite, as Juárez came into the fight with only a single victory in past six bouts. Shiro started the fight strongly, and remained dominant for the entirety of the bout. Two of the judges awarded him eleven of the twelve contested rounds, while the third judge scored every single round of the fight for Shiro.

Shiro vs. Taconing
Shiro was scheduled to make the sixth defense of his WBC light flyweight title against the reigning World Boxing Council International Light Flyweight champion Jonathan Taconing, on July 12, 2019. The fight was scheduled for the undercard of a middleweight match between Rob Brant and Ryota Murata. Shiro opened as a -3333 favorite to beat Taconing. Shiro won the fight by a fourth-round technical knockout. Early on in the fourth round, Shiro responded to Taconing's pressure by sidestepping and hitting his opponent with a counter-right straight. Although Taconing was able to stand up in time to beat the count, referee Frank Garza decided to stop the fight, deeming Taconing unable to continue fighting. During a post-fight interview, Shiro stated his desire to surpass Yoko Gushiken's legendary record of 13 title defenses.

Shiro vs. Petalcorin
Shiro was scheduled to fight the reigning IBF light flyweight champion Felix Alvarado in a title unification bout, on December 23, 2019. The fight was scheduled as one part of a Japanese triple header of title fights, which also featured Akira Yaegashi challenging Moruti Mthalane and Ryota Murata defending his WBA title against Steven Butler. Alvarado withdrew from the bout on November 19, 2020, due to a bronchial problem, which left him unable to train. Randy Petalcorin was announced as the replacement for Alvarado on November 22, 2020. It was Petalcorin's second title fight, having previously fought Felix Alvarado for the IBF light flyweight title. Petalcorin had a strong start to the fight, establishing his jab, which enabled him to win the first two rounds of the contest. Shiro began landing shots to the body of Petalcorin in the third round, scoring three body shot knockdowns. Although Petalcorin was able to beat the count on all three of those knockdowns, he was unable to do the same for the fourth knockdown, a minute into the fourth round.

Shiro vs. Hisada
Shiro was scheduled to make his eight WBC title defense against the he mandatory challenger Tetsuya Hisada, on December 18, 2020. However, on November 15, 2020, Shiro was involved in a drunk driving incident, during which he drove into another persons property and crashed into a vehicle parked there. Following this incident, the Japanese Boxing Commission has suspended him for three months, issued a ¥3 million fine, and ordered him to perform between 48 and 200 hours community service. His eight title defense against Hisada was accordingly rescheduled for April 24, 2021. Shiro extended his title defense streak to eight, with a dominant decision victory over Hisada. Hisada was knocked down in the second round, and seemed unable to recover from it for the rest of the fight. Although he was unable to finish his opponent, Shiro nonetheless won the fight by a wide decision, with the scores of 118–109, 118-109 and 119–108.

Unified light flyweight champion

Shiro vs. Yabuki
Shiro was scheduled to make his ninth WBC title defense against the reigning Japanese light flyweight titlist Masamichi Yabuki on September 10, 2021, in his native Kyoto. Yabuki was the #1 ranked WBC light flyweight contender when the fight was booked. The fight was postponed on August 26, as both Shiro and his coach tested positive for COVID-19. The fight was rescheduled for September 22, 2021. Shiro lost the fight by a tenth-round technical knockout. After an even start to the fight, Shiro was unable to find his rhythm and appeared to be down on the judges' scorecards. The pace of the fight increased in the tenth round, with Yabuki winning most of the exchanges and unloading on Shiro near the end of the round, prompting the referee to stop the fight.

Two months after Shiro lost his belt, on November 15, 2021, representatives of both fighters held a press conference announcing that a rematch was in the works. The rematch for the WBC title was officially announced on January 24, 2022. It took place at the City Gym in Kyoto, Japan, on March 19, 2022. Shiro won the fight by a third-round knockout, flooring Yabuki with a right straight.

Shiro vs. Kyoguchi
Shiro faced the WBA (Super) and The Ring light flyweight titleholder Hiroto Kyoguchi in a title unification bout on November 1, 2022, in what was just the second ever title unification match between two titlists from Japan. The winner of the fight was expected to become the first recognized lineal champion in over a decade, since Giovani Segura vacated his title. He won the fight by a seventh-round technical knockout. The referee waved the bout off as Kyoguchi was unsteady on his feet and was unable to effectively defend. Teraji knocked his opponent down with a right cross in the fifth round.

Shiro vs. González
On November 9, 2022, Shiro was ordered to make a mandatory title defense against the one-time unified light flyweight champion Hekkie Budler. Budler agreed to an undisclosed step-aside fee on January 11, 2023, which allowed Shiro to enter into negotiations with the WBO light flyweight champion Jonathan González. The title unification bout is scheduled to take place on April 8, 2023, in Tokyo, Japan.

Professional boxing record

See also
List of world light-flyweight boxing champions
List of Japanese boxing world champions
Boxing in Japan

References

External links

Kenshiro Teraji - Profile, News Archive & Current Rankings at Box.Live

|-

|-

|-

|-

|-

|-

1992 births
Living people
Japanese male boxers
Light-flyweight boxers
World light-flyweight boxing champions
World Boxing Council champions
World Boxing Association champions
The Ring (magazine) champions
Sportspeople from Kyoto Prefecture
Kansai University alumni